State Route 22 (SR 22) is an east–west state highway in the U.S. state of California that serves southern Los Angeles County and northern Orange County. It runs between Pacific Coast Highway (State Route 1) in Long Beach and the Costa Mesa Freeway (State Route 55) in Orange by way of Garden Grove. The westernmost part of SR 22 runs along Long Beach's 7th Street. From West Garden Grove to its eastern terminus in Orange, it is known as the Garden Grove Freeway.

Route description
SR 22 begins at the intersection of 7th Street and Pacific Coast Highway (State Route 1) in Long Beach. Then, 7th Street widens from an expressway into a freeway just before crossing the San Gabriel River (and with it, the Los Angeles/Orange County line).  It then merges with the San Diego Freeway (Interstate 405) at the Interstate 605 interchange and runs concurrently with it for approximately three miles before the two routes diverge in northeastern Seal Beach.  Thereafter, the Garden Grove Freeway travels mostly within the city of Garden Grove or along its border with neighboring Westminster.  Just inside the Orange city limits, the freeway enters the infamously congested Orange Crush interchange with the Santa Ana and Orange Freeways (Interstate 5 and State Route 57, respectively).  It continues along the border of Orange and Santa Ana for  until terminating at the Costa Mesa Freeway (State Route 55).

SR 22 is part of the California Freeway and Expressway System, and is part of the National Highway System, a network of highways that are considered essential to the country's economy, defense, and mobility by the Federal Highway Administration. SR 22 from I-405 to SR 55 is known as the Garden Grove Freeway, as named by the State Highway Commission on October 22, 1957. An  stretch of Route 22 is named the Garden Grove Police Officers Memorial Highway to honor police officers killed in the line of duty.

History

SR 22 was originally designated in 1934, when the state highway system was first numbered. Before the freeway was built, it was routed along Garden Grove Boulevard (formerly Ocean Avenue).

Opened in 1967, the Garden Grove Freeway had the distinction of being one of the few freeways in Southern California to have never been widened from its original alignment, eventually resulting in severe rush hour congestion, particularly as Santa Ana's population surged to over 300,000 during the 1990s.

In late 2004, in response to California's budgetary deficit, OCTA began a widening project to add one mixed-flow and one high occupancy vehicle lane to the route in each direction, as well as reconfiguring and upgrading on and off ramps to contemporary standards at several interchanges, all funded by Measure M, the half-cent tax of Orange County, CA. This $700 million Design-Build projected completed in a record 2 year time frame in 2007 was led by consortium composed of Granite Construction and URS Corp. as the lead designer along with several sub-consultants. A second phase to add HOV lane interchanges at the I-605 junction and at the split with I-405 was recently completed.

Exit list

See also

References

External links

California @ AARoads.com - State Route 22
Caltrans: Route 22 highway conditions
California 22 @ Asphaltplanet.ca
California Highways: SR 22

022
022
State Route 022
State Route 022